Stanley Nshimbi (born 19 August 1992) is a Zambian football midfielder who currently plays for Red Arrows F.C.

References

1992 births
Living people
Zambian footballers
Zambia international footballers
Lusaka Dynamos F.C. players
Red Arrows F.C. players
ZESCO United F.C. players
Association football midfielders